G: Methamphetamine on the Navajo Nation, known simply as G is a 2004 independent documentary film directed and produced by Shonie De La Rosa and Larry Blackhorse Lowe. It explores the effect that methamphetamine has had on the Navajo Nation and interviews the people whose lives have been affected by the highly addictive drug.

Award
 2004 – American Indian Film Festival: Best Public Service Award

See also
 Mile Post 398, a drama directed and produced by the same team, with an all-Navajo cast

References

2004 documentary films
2004 films
American independent films
Navajo-language films
Films about Native Americans
Documentary films about Native Americans
Films set on the Navajo Nation
Films set in Arizona
Documentary films about drug addiction
2000s English-language films
2000s American films
2004 multilingual films
American multilingual films